Pakistani media has recently undergone many changes, including the role women play in it. It is striving to create awareness among masses about women’s rights and speaks largely about feminism. In rural areas, women lacked awareness and education however due to media, now they are more aware and the gender pay gap is reducing to a great extent. Many of the people are giving negative opinions regarding the role of media. Media has a detrimental role to play and doesn’t facilitate women in any way. Most of the people were of the opinion that media has projected a negative image of women and brought her weak points to the forefront. The drama industry has a big responsibility to shoulder in this regard.

The drama Zindagi Gulzar Hai was a great success by the media in showing a positive image of women in the society and her cultural importance. Most of the time, media shows negative things regarding women but this drama turned the direction to 180 degrees. This drama especially the role of Kashaf should have resulted in the motivation of many females and families who lack sons. Such dramas must be appreciated and more efforts like this must be done to promote the role of women through media.

Template of Drama 
Mostly TV Dramas shows that if boy and girl got in friendship, parents think that they're preparing for marriage by asking that for "for boys: do she cook food?, is she rich?, do she have dowry?", "for girls: did he earns?, do he have money?, do he have bank balance, house, cars?". another way our media shows, that if girl got seriously involved in altercations with boys, or if boy attack girl or vice versa, then only girls got targeted and then parents started doing her marriage without seeing a boy that can he make her happy?, mostly parents says to only girls that he will make you happy, if you don't do marriage to that boy, we'll get divorced".

Moreover, Nabeeha Chaudhary in her research paper argued that in Pakistani TV dramas, Home is shown to be the main domain of power and confinement as well.

Divorces in Drama 
Shadi, Talaq, Halala, has become status symbol to them. if we stop them, then mafia will react. It looks like PEMRA is sleeping.

See also
 Women in Pakistan

References

Women in Pakistan